The second season of the American reality competition streaming series The Circle began on April 14, 2021, on Netflix, and concluded on May 5, 2021. The season was announced in March 2020 when Netflix renewed The Circle for a second and third season. Michelle Buteau returned as host. 

Like the previous season, players compete against each other to become the most popular, but do not actually meet their competitors. Instead, they communicate through a specially designed app and are able to portray themselves in any way they choose.

On May 5, 2021, the season was won by DeLeesa St. Agathe, who had played the game as her husband, Trevor, and won the US$100,000 prize that came along with it. Chloe Veitch was the runner-up and won the Fan Favorite award and US$10,000.

Format 

The contestants, or "players", move into the same apartment building. However, the contestants do not meet face-to-face during the course of the competition, as they each live in their own individual apartment. They communicate solely using their profiles on a specially-designed social media app that gives them the ability to portray themselves in any way they choose. Players can thus opt to present themselves as a completely different personality to the other players, a tactic otherwise known as catfishing.

Throughout the series, the contestants "rate" one another from first to last place. At the end of the ratings, their average ratings are revealed to one another from lowest to highest. Normally, the two highest-rated players become "Influencers", while the remaining players will be at risk of being "blocked" by the Influencers. However, occasionally there may be a twist to the blocking process – varying from the lowest rating players being instantly blocked, the identity of the Influencers being a secret, or multiple players being blocked at one time. Blocked players are eliminated from the game, but are given the opportunity to meet one player still in the game in-person. A video message is shown to the remaining players to reveal if they were real or fake the day after.

During the finale, the contestants rate each other one final time, where the highest rated player wins the game and US$100,000. Also, fans of The Circle are able to vote for their favorite player. The player that receives the most votes is known as the Fan Favorite and receives US$10,000.

Players

The first eight players taking part in the season were revealed on April 5, 2021, with additional players being revealed during the run of the show.

Other appearances 
Chloe Veitch also starred on season 1 of Too Hot to Handle, Celebrity Ghost Trip and Celebrity Hunted. Lee Swift starred on The Grindhouse Radio. Terilisha has starred on #Washed and Triple D Revenge. Jack Atkins, Savannah Palacio, and Courtney Revolution starred on Floor Is Lava. Courtney and DeLeesa St. Agathe starred on Netflix’s Reality Games and were two of the four players representing team "The Circle". Bryant Wood has appeared on season 22 of America's Next Top Model.

Episodes

Results and elimination

Notes
 : In Episode 1, before deciding who to block, Terilisha and Savannah had a chance to save a player each. Terilisha chose to save Jack "Emily", while Savannah chose to save Deleesa "Trevor".
 : At the end of Episode 4, Savannah visited Courtney, viewing him as having the most potential to win. This indirectly gave Courtney secret access to the Inner Circle following Savannah's departure. 
 : As a part of the Joker Twist, Courtney was able to automatically pick an Influencer in the Inner Circle. Courtney chose to make River an Influencer.
 : In this round, there  were no influencers. Instead, the two lowest rated players would be blocked. Jack "Emily", placing 8th, and Lisa "Lance", placing 7th were respectively blocked from The Circle. Following the blocking, Jack and Lisa continued in the game together as new player John.
 : In Episode 12, the ratings were not published. Instead, the highest-rated player automatically became the "Superinfluencer," who could make the sole decision on whom to block.
 : In Episode 13, the players made their final ratings.

References

Circle
The Circle (franchise)